Godall is a municipality in the Montsià comarca, Tarragona Province, Catalonia, Spain. Godall gives its name to the Serra de Godall, a moderately high and smooth calcareous mountain range that rises above the town.
Local legend says that the village originated when people built a new settlement after abandoning the destroyed village of Merades, located within Godall's municipal term. The main economic activity is agriculture, particularly the growing of olive, carob, and almond trees.
Godall has lost more than half its inhabitants since the first half of the 20th century when population reached a high of 1,700.

Godall is part of the Taula del Sénia free association of municipalities. In 2009 its population was 841.

References

External links 
 Godall Town Hall webpage
 Government data pages 

Municipalities in Montsià
Populated places in Montsià